Clarenbach is a surname. Notable people with the surname include:

 Kathryn F. Clarenbach (1920–1994), early leader of the modern feminist 
 David Clarenbach (born 1953), Wisconsin Democratic politician 
 Adolf Clarenbach ( – 1529), burnt at the stake in Cologne, died as one of the first Protestant martyrs of the Reformation